Girl Monstar were an all female Australian rock band which formed 1988 with the line-up of Damian Child on bass guitar; Anne McCue on lead guitar and vocals; Sherry Valier (aka Sherry Rich) on vocals and rhythm guitar (ex-Cactus Fever); and Sue World on drums and vocals (ex-The Wet Ones). Both of their singles, "Surfing on a Wave of Love" / "He's Hell" (1989) and "Joe Cool" (1990), topped the Australian Independent charts. They issued one album, Monstereo Delicio, in July 1992 on Timberyard Records. Child was replaced by Janene Abbott but the group disbanded in 1993. Australian musicologist, Ian McFarlane, described their sound "trash pop style mixed tough guitar riffs with strong harmonies". Valier as Rich, is a country rock artist and has issued solo material as well as performing in bands. McCue is also an alternative country artist, she relocated to Nashville and has released several solo albums.

History
Girl Monstar formed in 1988 in Melbourne with the line-up of Damian Child (Feline Touch) on bass guitar and vocals; Anne McCue (Vertigo) on lead guitar, slide guitar and vocals; Sherry Valier (aka Sherry Rich)(Obscure Alternatives, Cactus Fever) on lead vocals, harmonica and rhythm guitar; and Ritchie Hine on drums.  After a few months Hine left the band to join the newly formed Screaming Tribesmen and was replaced by Sue World (Wet Ones). The group signed with Timberyard Records and in October 1989 issued their debut double-A-sided single, "Surfing on a Wave of Love" / "He's Hell". Both tracks are written by Valier.

Early in 1990 Girl Monstar supported the Australian leg of a tour by Danish hard rock group, D. A. D., which was followed by a similar support for United States heavy metal band, Skid Row. Later that year they issued a second single, "Joe Cool", which is also written by Valier.

Both of their singles, "Surfing on a Wave of Love" / "He's Hell" and "Joe Cool", topped the Australian Independent charts. The single "Joe Cool", was produced by Kevin 'Cavemen' Shirley. The band provided a support show for The Buzzcocks and then The Ramones.

In July 1992 Girl Monstar released their debut album, Monstereo Delicio, which was produced by Paul Kosky (Not Drowning, Waving) and Jedd Starr. After it was recorded but before it was issued Child was replaced on bass guitar by Janene Abbott. The group disbanded in early 1993. Valier has a recording career as a country rock artist, Sherry Rich, which has included an album recorded with members of Wilco. She formed the groups, Sherry Rich and the Grievous Angels and Sherry Rich and Courtesy Move. Rich performed as part of The Grapes with Ash Naylor on guitar, and from 2004 in The Mudcakes, which included former Girl Monstar bandmate, Sue World and Rich's husband, Rick Plant. Anne McCue is based in Nashville and has a recording career as an alternative country solo artist. 
In 2010, Girl Monstar were featured in 'Rock Chicks' – an exhibition held at Melbourne's Arts Centre, which highlighted the achievements of women in the Australian music scene.

Members
 Damian Child – bass guitar, vocals (1988–92)
 Ritchie Heine – drums (1988)
 Anne McCue – lead guitar, vocals (1988–93)
 Sherry Valier – lead vocals, guitar (1988–93)
 Sue World – drums, vocals (1988–93)
 Paddy Chong – bass guitar (1991)
 Janene Abbott – bass guitar (1992–93)
Sources:

Discography

Albums

Singles

Other appearances
 "Dead by Christmas" on Rockin Bethlehem – Timberyard (SAW025) (1989)
 "Is that You?" on Hard to Believe: Kiss Covers Compilation – Waterfront Records (DAMP121) (1990)

Awards and nominations

ARIA Music Awards
The ARIA Music Awards are a set of annual ceremonies presented by Australian Recording Industry Association (ARIA), which recognise excellence, innovation, and achievement across all genres of the music of Australia. They commenced in 1987.

! 
|-
| 1990
| "Surfing on a Wave"/"He's Hell"
| ARIA Award for Best Independent Release
| 
| rowspan="2"| 
|-
| 1991
| "Joe Cool"
| Best Independent Release
|

References

All-female bands
Australian rock music groups
Musical groups established in 1988
Musical groups disestablished in 1993
Victoria (Australia) musical groups
Australian girl groups
Timberyard Records artists